Mary Aroni was a famous Greek actress. She was born in 1916 in Athens, Greece. She first appeared in theatre in 1935 and she mainly acted in theatre. She made only four cinema appearances in her acting life. She lived in
Kalamaki, near Athens and she played in cinema together with Dionysis Papagiannopoulos and Lambros Konstantaras.

References
Who's Who 1979, pg. 53.

1916 births
1992 deaths
Actresses from Athens
20th-century Greek actresses